In literary criticism and rhetoric, a tautology is a statement that repeats an idea, using near-synonymous morphemes, words or phrases, effectively "saying the same thing twice". Tautology and pleonasm are not consistently differentiated in literature. Like pleonasm, tautology is often considered a fault of style when unintentional. Intentional repetition may emphasize a thought or help the listener or reader understand a point. Sometimes logical tautologies like "Boys will be boys" are conflated with language tautologies, but a language tautology is not inherently true, while a logical tautology always is.

Etymology

It first appeared in English in the 16th century. The use of the term logical tautology was introduced in English by Wittgenstein in 1919, perhaps following Auguste Comte's usage in 1835.

Examples
 "Only time will tell if we stand the test of time," from the Van Halen song "Why Can't This Be Love"
 "After we change the game it won't remain the same." from the Blackalicious song "Blazing Arrow"
 "That tautological statement has repeated an idea."
 "There once was a fellow from Perth
Who was born on the day of his birth.
He got married, they say
On his wife's wedding day,
And died when he quitted the earth."
"...A forget-me-not, to remind me to remember not to forget." from the Benny Hill song "My Garden of Love"
Assless chaps.  Chaps by definition are separate leg-coverings; a similar garment joined at the seat would instead be called a pair of trousers.
"...und wenn sie nicht gestorben sind, dann leben sie noch heute" (and if they are not dead, then they are still alive today), traditional German formula to end a fairy tale (like "they lived happily ever after").
"'Former alumni' - alumni means those who are former members of an institution, group, school etc.
"'Wandering planet' - the word planet comes from the Greek word πλανήτης (planḗtēs), which itself means "wanderer".
 "If you know, you know", a common English phrase.

Abbreviations

Abbreviations whose last abbreviated word is often redundantly included anyway.

ATM machine
COVID disease
DC Comics
DVD disc
EDM music
GPS system
HIV virus
ICBM missile
ISBN number
LCD display
PAT test (Photographic Activity Test or Paddington alcohol test)
PIN number
Please R.S.V.P.
RAID array
RAS syndrome
RAT test
SARS syndrome
SAT test
SSD drive
UPC code
VIN number
VIP person

Discussion
Intentional repetition of meaning intends to amplify or emphasize a particular, usually significant fact about what is being discussed. For example, a gift is, by definition, free of charge; using the phrase "free gift" might emphasize that there are no hidden conditions or fine print (such as the expectation of money or reciprocation) or that the gift is being given by volition.

This is related to the rhetorical device of hendiadys, where one concept is expressed through the use of two descriptive words or phrases: for example, using "goblets and gold" to mean wealth, or "this day and age" to refer to the present time. Superficially, these expressions may seem tautological, but they are stylistically sound because the repeated meaning is just a way to emphasize the same idea.

The use of tautologies, however, is usually unintentional. For example, the phrases "mental telepathy", "planned conspiracies", and "small dwarfs" imply that there are such things as physical telepathy, spontaneous conspiracies, and giant dwarfs, which are oxymorons.

Parallelism is not tautology, but rather a particular stylistic device. Much Old Testament poetry is based on parallelism: the same thing said twice, but in slightly different ways (Fowler describes this as pleonasm). However, modern biblical study emphasizes that there are subtle distinctions and developments between the two lines, such that they are usually not truly the "same thing". Parallelism can be found wherever there is poetry in the Bible: Psalms, the Books of the Prophets, and in other areas as well.

See also

 Bilingual tautological expressions
 Truism
 Figure of speech
 Grammar
 Hyperbole
 Lapalissade
 Tautological place names
 No true Scotsman
 Oxymoron
 Parallelism (rhetoric)
 Platitude
 Pleonasm
 Redundancy (linguistics)
 Tautophrase

References

External links

 Figures of Speech: Tautology
 Tautology Explained

Sentences by type
Rhetoric
Linguistics
Propositions
Semantics